Villogorgia rubra  is a species of colonial soft coral sea fan in the family Plexauridae. The scientific name of the species was first validly published in 1899 by Isa Hiles.

See also
N-Methyltryptamine
Hallucinogenic fish

References

Animals described in 1899
Plexauridae